Sarona may refer to:

 Sarona (colony), a neighborhood of Tel Aviv, Israel
 Sarona (community), Wisconsin,  an unincorporated community located in the town of Sarona, Washburn County, Wisconsin, United States
 Sarona, Wisconsin, town in Washburn County, Wisconsin, United States

Sarona is also a feminine given name. Notable people with the name include:

 Sarona Aiono-Iosefa (born 1962), Samoan New Zealander who writes children's fiction

See also 

Sharona (disambiguation)